How Rare a Possession is a 64-minute film produced by the Church of Jesus Christ of Latter-day Saints (LDS Church). It depicts the conversion stories of Parley P. Pratt, a church leader in the 19th century, and Vincenzo di Francesca, an Italian pastor in the 20th century, who both join the church after studying the Book of Mormon. It also shows several key scenes from the Book of Mormon.

In October 2017, it was reported that the LDS Church had acquired the handwritten testimony of Di Francesca, penned in 1966.

See also

 The Church of Jesus Christ of Latter-day Saints in Italy

References

External links
 "How Rare a Possession" : a behind-the-scene look at the conversion of Vincenzo di Francesca and the LDS movie, UA 1163 at L. Tom Perry Special Collections, Harold B. Lee Library, Brigham Young University
 "How Rare a Possession" at Mormon Literature and Creative Arts Database
 

1987 films
Films produced by the Church of Jesus Christ of Latter-day Saints
1987 in Christianity
1980s English-language films